The 1992 Delaware gubernatorial election took place on November 3, 1992. Incumbent Republican Governor Mike Castle, barred by term limits from seeking another term as Governor of Delaware, instead sought election to the United States House of Representatives. Congressman and Democratic nominee Tom Carper defeated Republican nominee B. Gary Scott in a landslide, winning his first term in office and becoming Delaware's first Democratic governor since 1977. As of 2023, this is the last time the Governor’s office in Delaware changed partisan control.

Democratic primary

Candidates
Tom Carper, U.S. Representative, former Delaware State Treasurer
Daniel D. Rappa

Results

Republican primary

Candidates
B. Gary Scott, insurance company executive
Wilfred Plomis

Results

General election

Results

References

1992
Gubernatorial
1992 United States gubernatorial elections